The 2021–22 season was the 56th season of NEROCA FC in existence and Fifth season in the I-League
NEROCA were relegated after finishing 11th in the previous season, but were reinstated by AIFF after viewing the situation of Covid-19 pandemic.

Senior Team Squad 

 

 

 (On loan from Hyderabad FC)

New and extended contracts

Transfers

Transfers in

Loans in

Transfers out

Current technical staff

Pre-season

Competitions

I-League

League table

References

2021–22 I-League by team
NEROCA FC seasons